Ievgeniia Tetelbaum (born July 31, 1991) is an Israeli Olympic synchronized swimmer. She was born in Ukraine, and made an aliyah when she was 18 years old. She was the reserve swimmer of Israel in 2012 Olympics. After the Olympics, she started to compete with Anastasia Gloushkov as a partner. They placed 12th in 2014 European Aquatics Championships and 20th in 2015 World Aquatics Championships. In 2016, Tetelbaum and Gloushkov placed 12th in the 2016 Olympic Qualification Tournament and represented Israel at the 2016 Summer Olympics. Next this year, Tetelbaum and Gloushkov participated in the 2016 European Aquatics Championships, Finishing in 9th place (Free routine) with a score of 80.8667 and 10th place (Technical routine) with a score of 79.7444.

References

External links
 
 Ievgeniia Tetelbaum at Swimming Israel
 

1991 births
Living people
Israeli Jews
Ukrainian emigrants to Israel
Israeli synchronized swimmers
Jewish swimmers
Olympic synchronized swimmers of Israel
Sportspeople from Jerusalem
People from Jerusalem
Synchronized swimmers at the 2016 Summer Olympics
Synchronized swimmers at the 2015 World Aquatics Championships
Israeli people of Ukrainian-Jewish descent